Rita Kuti-Kis (born 13 February 1978) is a former professional tennis player from Hungary.

In 1992, she was beaten by future international No. 1, Martina Hingis, in the Petits As competition, a juniors tournament at Tarbes, France which has been renowned for the discovery of young tennis talent. Kuti-Kis's most successful year was 2000, when she scored her one and only WTA Tour singles title in São Paulo. In the same year, she reached the third round of the French Open (losing to Monica Seles) and defeated then up-coming Jelena Dokić in the first round of the Australian Open. 

Kuti-Kis retired from professional tennis in 2006.

WTA career finals

Singles: 4 (1 title, 3 runner-ups)

Doubles: 2 (2 runner-ups)

ITF Circuit finals

Singles: 10 (4–6)

Doubles: 10 (7–3)

Best Grand Slam results details

Singles

Head-to-head record
 Serena Williams 0-1
 Arantxa Sánchez Vicario 0-1
 Anna Kournikova 0-1
 Nadia Petrova 0-1
 Jelena Dokic 1-1
 Jelena Janković 0-1

External links
 
 
 

1978 births
Living people
People from Lengyeltóti
Hungarian female tennis players
Tennis players at the 2000 Summer Olympics
Olympic tennis players of Hungary
Sportspeople from Somogy County